Proto-oncogene vav is a protein that in humans is encoded by the VAV1 gene.

Function 

The protein encoded by this proto-oncogene is a member of the Dbl family of guanine nucleotide exchange factors (GEF) for the Rho family of GTP binding proteins. The protein is important in hematopoiesis, playing a role in T-cell and B-cell development and activation. This particular GEF has been identified as the specific binding partner of Nef proteins from HIV-1. Coexpression and binding of these partners initiates profound morphological changes, cytoskeletal rearrangements and the JNK/SAPK signaling cascade, leading to increased levels of viral transcription and replication.

Interactions 

VAV1 has been shown to interact with:

 ARHGDIB, 
 Abl gene, 
 Cbl gene 
 EZH2,
 Grb2, 
 JAK2, 
 Ku70, 
 LAT, 
 LCP2, 
 MAPK1, 
 PIK3R1, 
 PLCG1, 
 PRKCQ, 
 S100B, 
 SHB, 
 SIAH2,  and
 Syk.

References

Further reading